Buffalo Municipal Airport may refer to:

Buffalo Municipal Airport (Minnesota) in Buffalo, Minnesota, United States (FAA: CFE)
Buffalo Municipal Airport (Missouri) in Buffalo, Missouri, United States (FAA: H17)
Buffalo Municipal Airport (Oklahoma) in Buffalo, Oklahoma, United States (FAA: BFK)

See also
Buffalo Airport (disambiguation)